Aung San Oo (born in 1943) is a Burmese
engineer who is the elder brother of politician and Nobel Peace Prize winner Aung San Suu Kyi; the two are the only surviving children of Burmese independence leader Aung San. 

Aung San Oo has been described by the Burmese Lawyers' Council and the National Coalition Government of the Union of Burma as a potential surrogate of the junta in an attempt to humiliate Aung San Suu Kyi and place her in an untenable position. Time magazine reports that, according to Burmese exiles and observers in Rangoon, the junta used the alleged surrogacy of  Aung San Oo and his lawsuit as an act of spite against the National League for Democracy leader.

Aung San Oo was educated in England and immigrated to the United States in 1973. His wife, Lei Lei Nwe Thein (also spelled Leilei Nwe Thein), is also an American citizen.

Litigation 
Aung San Oo is estranged from his sister; while Suu Kyi became the leader of the Burmese National League for Democracy party, Oo is close to the ruling military junta. In 2000, Oo brought legal action against Suu Kyi in the Rangoon High Court demanding a half-share in the family home, where she had been held under intermittent house arrest from 1989 to 2010. There was widespread speculation at the time that Aung San Oo would then sell his half-share to the junta, but the High Court ruled against Oo. The Burmese Lawyers' Council describes the lawsuit as an attempt by the junta to publicly humiliate the leader of the National League for Democracy. The Burmese Government in exile claims that had Aung San Oo won his case, he would have put Aung San Suu Kyi in an extremely precarious position. In the Time article it is also reported that the junta may have used this legal manoeuver to "back Aung San Suu Kyi into a corner", despite advice to the contrary by the visiting former Japanese Prime Minister Ryutaro Hashimoto the year before the lawsuit.

References 

Burmese emigrants to the United States
1943 births
Living people
Place of birth missing (living people)
Engineers from California
Burmese engineers
People from San Diego
Aung San Suu Kyi
Family of Aung San